The MidSouth Rail Corporation  is a railroad line operated by Kansas City Southern Railway (KCS) as a result of the January 1, 1994, acquisition; KCS began operating over MidSouth's line on January 11, 1994. The line ran from Shreveport, Louisiana, going east across Louisiana, and across the state of Mississippi, running through the cities of Vicksburg, Jackson, Meridian, and Artesia, Mississippi, then across the Alabama state line to Tuscaloosa, and finally (via Norfolk Southern Railway trackage rights) into Birmingham. Midsouth had two other branches, with one to Counce, Tennessee, and a disconnected line from Gulfport to Hattiesburg, Mississippi. Total mileage was  worth of mostly former Illinois Central Gulf's east-west Shreveport - Meridian main line.

Operations
On March 31, 1986, MidSouth Rail Corp. was created to purchase  of Illinois Central Gulf Railroad (ICG), with start up operations on April 1, 1986. Edward L. Moyers served as the railroad's first president. MSRC was mostly the ex-ICG route between Meridian, Mississippi, and Shreveport, Louisiana, with the earliest segment of this line being built in 1833 by the Clinton and Vicksburg Railroad. On September 8, 1987, MSRC acquired the North Louisiana and Gulf Railroad and its subsidiary, Central Louisiana and Gulf Railroad, These properties were combined as subsidiary MidLouisiana Rail Corporation. 

On April 14, 1988, MidSouth merged with the Gulf and Mississippi Railroad, itself an ICG spinoff. MSRC operated this property under the name of SouthRail.

Kansas City Southern takeover
On January 11, 1994, Kansas City Southern Railway took over operations of all of Midsouth Rail Corp.'s lines, creating its Meridian Corridor to connect with the Norfolk Southern Railway.

References 

Predecessors of the Kansas City Southern Railway
Defunct Louisiana railroads
Defunct Mississippi railroads
Railway companies established in 1986
Railway companies disestablished in 1993
1986 establishments in Mississippi
1994 mergers and acquisitions